The Champlain Mall is a shopping mall located in Brossard, Quebec, Canada at the intersection of Taschereau Boulevard and Lapinière Boulevard. Champlain Mall is named in honour of Samuel de Champlain but references the Champlain Bridge that was built 13 years prior to the mall's opening.

Champlain Mall is strategically located in Brossard: on the South Shore's longest commercial artery Taschereau Boulevard (Quebec Route 134), near Autoroute 10 and adjacent to Terminus Brossard-Panama. Thus, the mall attracts about 6.4 million visitors every year.

History
Champlain Mall's history goes all the way back to October 1957, before the city of Brossard was founded, when Ivanhoe Corporation, through its business partner Westmount Realties Company, acquired a series of lots from La Prairie-de-la-Madeleine Parish with the intent of building a shopping centre at the corner of what is now Provencher and Pelletier boulevards. After Ivanhoe submitted a request on 12 September 1960, to the emerging City of Brossard for the development of land for the shopping mall, it took 15 years for the Champlain Mall to be constructed.

Champlain Mall inaugurated in the fall of 1975 at 300,000 square feet with 60 stores, and Sears and Steinberg's as major anchors. Sears and Steinberg's had themselves been opened to the public since the beginning of the year, respectively on 12 March and April 1975. In the case of Sears, it was its first location in Greater Montreal. The Champlain Mall was developed by Ivanhoe Corporation, a wholly-owned real estate unit of Steinberg's. 
A Miracle Mart store later joined the mall whose name was subsequently shortened to M in August 1986.

An expansion was completed in August 1988 which saw the mall reached more than 700 000 square feet. As part of this phase was the appearance of The Bay which inaugurated its store on 3 August 1988. An estimate of 50 new boutique spaces were added. The portion of Champlain Mall that was added during this expansion corresponds to the two mall wings that both lead to The Bay store. The current food court and multi-level parking lot also happened during that phase.

Champlain Mall was jointly owned by Ivanhoe and Kerrybrooke, the real-estate subsidiaries of Steinberg's and Sears Canada respectively. In 1990, Sears divested itself of 25% of its ownership in the Champlain Mall. In 1994, Ivanhoe acquired the remaining shares Sears held in the mall. Sears continued to be an anchor tenant for several decades.

On 10 August 1994, Les Ailes de la Mode opened the first store of its chain at the Champlain Mall in the former M store site.

An IMAX theatre was built in the mall in 1996. It was the largest IMAX theatre in the province and was one of the few in the world to use a personal sound environment headset and special 3-D glasses. The theatre eventually closed on 6 November 2000, over a contractual dispute between its operator TheMax Inc. and its content provider IMAX Corporation.

In early 1998, Archambault announced that it would open by the summer a 20,000-square foot megastore.

Sears completed in September 1998 a $20-million makeover of three of its stores at Champlain Mall, Galeries d'Anjou and Carrefour Laval.

A$40 million facelift was completed at the Champlain Mall in late 2011 to better compete against South Shore rivals Quartier DIX30 and Promenades Saint Bruno.

In October 2014, Ivanhoé Cambridge sold the Champlain Mall to Cominar.

On 21 April 2018, Decathlon opened its first Canadian store in the former space of Les Ailes de la Mode.

A Mayrand supermarket opened its door on 15 July 2020, occupying a good part of the former Sears location.

Anchors and tenants

This is a list of the major anchors and tenants at Champlain Mall, organized by descending leased area.

Anchors
Hudson's Bay 
Decathlon
Mayrand
Atmosphère/Sports Experts
Archambault

See also
Brossard
List of largest shopping malls in Canada
List of shopping malls in Canada

References

External links
Official website
Ivanhoe Cambridge Leasing

Buildings and structures in Brossard
Shopping malls established in 1975
Shopping malls in Quebec
Tourist attractions in Montérégie
1975 establishments in Quebec